Mükerrem Selen Soyder (born 26 December 1986) is a Turkish actress, activist, model and beauty pageant titleholder who was crowned Miss World Turkey 2007 and represented her country in the Miss World 2007 in Sanya, China.

Career
Soyder has appeared in several series including Lale Devri, Yer Gök Aşk and Reaksiyon and Hangimiz Sevmedik.

Personal life
Before the Ottoman Empire collapsed, in 1900, her family is of Turkish descent who immigrated to Izmir from Ioannina (now, in Greece). In 2015, she married Turkish Jewish businessman Oren Frances.

Filmography

Awards

References

External links

Turkish female models
Miss Turkey winners
Miss World 2007 delegates
Living people
1986 births
Actresses from İzmir